Incognito is a British acid jazz band. Their debut album, Jazz Funk, was released in 1981.

Jean-Paul 'Bluey' Maunick is the band's leader, singer, guitarist, composer, and record producer. The band has included Linda Muriel, Jocelyn Brown, Maysa Leak, Tony Momrelle, Imaani, Vanessa Haynes, Mo Brandis, Natalie Williams, Carleen Anderson, Pamela (PY) Anderson, Kelli Sae, and Joy Malcolm.

History

Incognito was founded by Paul "Tubbs" Williams & Jean-Paul "Bluey" Maunick in 1979, as an offshoot from Light of the World. Light of the World was a substantially sized group and following various changes to the lineup, the founding members Breeze Mckrieth, Kenny Wellington & David Baptiste – inspired by American funk bands such as Funkadelic forming offshoot bands like Parliament – formed Beggar & Co. Bluey & Tubbs went on to form Incognito. However, there has seen a re-connection over the years in Light of the World with various former members, alongside their other commitments.

Incognito has had intermittent success in the UK Singles Chart, with their breakthrough 1991 hit a cover version of the Ronnie Laws tune "Always There", featuring Jocelyn Brown, which made No. 6 in the UK. The group's 1992 single, "Don't You Worry 'bout a Thing" saw similar success, reaching No. 19 in the UK. They have also been a favourite of various re-mixers, including Masters at Work, David Morales, Roger Sanchez and Jazzanova, and have released several albums consisting almost entirely of remixes.

In 1994, Incognito appeared on the Red Hot Organization's compilation album, Stolen Moments: Red Hot + Cool.  The album, meant to raise awareness and funds in support of the AIDS epidemic in relation to the African American community, was heralded as 'Album of the Year' by Time magazine. In 1996, the band contributed "Water to Drink" to the AIDS-benefit album Red Hot + Rio, also produced by the Red Hot Organization.

Their song "Need to Know" is the theme song for progressive radio and television news program Democracy Now!.

In 2021, the band reissued a celebratory, 40th anniversary, 106 track retrospective of their debut album, Jazz Funk. The Brit funk pioneers have released a music video for the track "You Are in My System." The deluxe reissue features a 52 page booklet with liner notes written by Charles Waring and a selection of the band's archive photos.

In October 2022, the band was the first group to be honored as part of Universal Music Recording's "Black Story" series which honors Black UK artists as part of the UK's Black History Month.

Discography

References

Further reading

External links
 Official Incognito website
 Incognito discography, album releases & credits at Discogs
 Incognito interview by Pete Lewis in Blues & Soul magazine (July 2010)
 Incognito interview by Chris Mann at Smooth-Jazz.de (September 2008)

Musical groups established in 1979
Acid jazz ensembles
English jazz ensembles
Smooth jazz ensembles
Heads Up International artists
Verve Records artists
Blue Thumb Records artists
Mercury Records artists
Talkin' Loud artists
Chrysalis Records artists
Narada Productions artists
English funk musical groups
British soul musical groups
Musical groups from London